Orthoacetic acid or ethane-1,1,1-triol is an hypothetical organic compound with formula  or H3C-C(OH)3.  It would be an  ortho acid with the ethane backbone.

Orthoacetic acid is believed to be impossible to isolate, since it would readily decompose into acetic acid and water.  It may have a fleeting existence in aqueous solutions of acetic acid.

Orthoacetate anions
The three hydroxyls of CH3C(OH)3 could be deprotonated, leading successively to CH3C(OH)2(O–) (dihydrogenorthoacetate),  CH3C(OH)(O–)2 (hydrogenorthoacetate), and finally CH3C(O–)3 (orthoacetate).

Orthoacetate esters
There are many stable organic compounds with the trivalent moiety H3CC(OR)3, which are formally esters of orthoacetic acid and  called orthoacetates.  They include trimethyl orthoacetate and triethyl orthoacetate, which are commercially available.

See also
 Orthoformic acid

References

Organic acids
Hypothetical chemical compounds